Port Royal Historic District is a national historic district located at Port Royal, Caroline County, Virginia. The district encompasses 35 contributing buildings in the historic core of the 18th century tobacco port of Port Royal. Notable buildings include the 18th-century Fox's Tavern, the mid-19th century Masonic Hall, the 18th-century frame mansion of the Brockenbrough family, the Hipkins-Carr House, the Gray House, and St. Peter's Episcopal Church (c. 1836). Townfield and Riverview are separately listed.

It was listed on the National Register of Historic Places in 1970.

References

External links
 St. Peter's Episcopal Church, Rectory, Water Street (State Route 1006), Port Royal, Caroline County, VA at the Historic American Buildings Survey (HABS)

Historic districts in Caroline County, Virginia
National Register of Historic Places in Caroline County, Virginia
Historic American Buildings Survey in Virginia
Historic districts on the National Register of Historic Places in Virginia